Sufivand may refer to a location in Iran:

 Sufivand, Harsin, Kermanshah Province
 Sufivand, Kermanshah